Rodolfo de Álzaga Unzué (September 21, 1930 – April 19, 1994 in Buenos Aires) was an Argentine racing driver. He won the Turismo Carretera championship in 1959.

Death 
He was buried in La Recoleta Cemetery in Buenos Aires.

References 

1930 births
1994 deaths
Racing drivers from Buenos Aires
Argentine racing drivers
Turismo Carretera drivers
World Sportscar Championship drivers
Place of birth missing
Burials at La Recoleta Cemetery